Craig Douglas Le Cornu (born 17 September 1960) is an English footballer, who played as a midfielder in the Football League for Tranmere Rovers. After 40 years of anonymity, Craig was the somewhat unlikely star of the 30th June 2022 episode of 'The News Show' on the A Trip To The Moon Tranmere podcast, to the evident satisfaction of stats guru, Rob Edwards (the other one).

References

External links

Tranmere Rovers F.C. players
Liverpool F.C. players
Oswestry Town F.C. players
English Football League players
Association football midfielders
1960 births
Living people
English footballers
People from Birkenhead